Kokkolan Hermes is a Finnish semi-professional ice hockey club based in Kokkola that plays in the Mestis, the second-tier men's league in Finland after Liiga. The club was founded in 1953 and play their home games at the Kokkolan jäähalli, which has a capacity of 4,200 spectators.

The club also supports an active minor ice hockey department, which hosts junior teams in the men's U16 Mestis, U17 Mestis, U18 Mestis, U18 Aluesarja, and U20 Mestis. Hermes previously included women's teams in the U16 Naisten Aluesarja and, until 2019, the U20 Finnish Championship tournament.

History
The club was founded in 1953 when the ice hockey players of GBK and KPV merged their operations and formed the new club Kokkolan Hermes. The team was named after the Greek Olympian messenger god Hermes who was also the god of sports and athletes.

Hermes played in the second top league of Finland from 1993–2006 before being regulated to Suomi-sarja where they remained until 2015 when they were promoted back to Mestis.

Hermes won the 1996 I-Divisioona championship, the only championship in the club's history.

During the 2008-09 season Hermes ran into financial troubles and were forced to leave the Suomi-sarja.

Current roster
Updated June 1, 2016

|}

Retired numbers
 #1 - Tapio Salo
 #7 - Tuomo Valavaara
 9 - Eino Pollari
 23 - Jani Uski
 91 - Jouni Kalliokoski

Technical staff
Current as of 1 June 2016

All time statistics leaders

Season by season record

Since founding of Mestis in 2000–01

References

External links
Official website 

Mestis teams
Kokkola
Ice hockey clubs established in 1953
Ice hockey teams in Finland
Sports teams in Finland
1953 establishments in Finland